Nonna Felicità is a 1938 Italian film directed by Mario Mattoli and starring Dina Galli. It was made as a sequel to the 1937 film Felicita Colombo. It was shot at the Cinecittà Studios in Rome.

Cast
 Dina Galli as Felicità Colombo
 Armando Falconi as Il conte Jean Scotti
 Maurizio D'Ancora as Ambrogino
 Nino Taranto as Nino Senesi
 Angelo Gandolfi as Giuseppe Grossi
 Lilia Dale as Odette (as Lilly Hand)
 Lydia Johnson as La baronessa Michette
 Paolo Varna as Il barone (as Ottorino Visconti)

References

External links

1938 films
1938 comedy films
1930s Italian-language films
Italian black-and-white films
Films directed by Mario Mattoli
Films shot at Cinecittà Studios
Italian comedy films
Italian sequel films
Films set in Milan
1930s Italian films